Sture Bjørvig (born 5 November 1973) is a Norwegian competition rower. He was born in Trondheim, but represented the club Norske Studenters RK. He competed at the 2000 Summer Olympics in Sydney, where he placed ninth in coxless fours, together with Kjetil Undset, Steffen Størseth and Nils-Torolv Simonsen.

References

External links

Norwegian male rowers
1973 births
Living people
Sportspeople from Trondheim
Rowers at the 2000 Summer Olympics
Olympic rowers of Norway